Amirul Azhan bin Aznan (born 23 July 1993) is a Malaysian professional footballer who plays for Malaysia Super League club Negeri Sembilan. Amirul plays mainly as a right-back but can also play as a winger.

Club career

Perak
Amirul began his football career with Perak youth team before got promoted to the first team in 2016. He was part of the youth team which won the President Cup in 2012. Amirul made his league debut for Perak in a 0–0 draw against Kedah on 27 February 2016.

International
On 16 August 2017, Amirul received his first call-up to the Malaysia national team for the centralised training as a preparation for 2019 Asian Cup qualifiers Group B match against Hong Kong on 5 September 2017. Amirul made his debut for Malaysia coming off the bench against Myanmar in a 1–0 defeat on the friendly game on 30 August 2017.

Career statistics

Club

International

Honours

Club
Perak
 Malaysia FA Cup: 2019
 Malaysia Cup: 2018
 Malaysia Super League runner-up: 2018

International
Malaysia
 AFF Championship runner-up: 2018

References

External links
 
 

1993 births
Living people
Malaysian footballers
Perak F.C. players
Malaysia Super League players
People from Perak
People from Ipoh
Malaysia international footballers
Association football defenders